Erika Suderburg is a contemporary American filmmaker and writer.

Early life 
Suderburg was born in 1959 in Minneapolis, Minnesota.

Education
From 1975 to 1977, she attended the UNC North Carolina School of the Arts, in Theater Design and Production. Afterwards, she attended the University of North Carolina at Chapel Hill in Film and Television, then earned her B.F.A. at Minneapolis College of Art and Design in 1981 in media arts.  In 1984, she received her M.F.A. degree from the University of California, San Diego.

Career
Towards the beginning of her career, Suderburg experimented with dance and performance art. Her interest in experimental film drew her from the midwest to San Diego to study with Jean-Pierre Gorin and Michel de Certeau and later to Los Angeles.  Inspired by California's diverse terrain, she began to incorporate aerial views into her films, and topography became a recurring theme in her work. Suderburg's films are interactive and experimental; they engage the viewer rather than absorb them. For instance, in her short film Strip (2006), the camera pans rapidly over the lines of a painting, animating the still canvas with jarring movements. Rather than writing out a script, Suderburg collects footage and still images, then pieces them together. Her feature-length study of empires, Decline and Fall (2007), is one such work.  Juxtaposing footage of bombings, aerial surveillance, and protests, it draws meaning from a variety of different sources, especially history and memory.  Suderburg does not consider  film a strictly linear medium but a form of hypermedia embracing both screen and viewer. 

Decline and Fall (2007), a provocative examination of power and destruction that brings together World War II archival footage with more recent peace protests in Rome and Los Angeles, as well as imagery drawn from everyday life. We see old black-and-white footage showing the devastation of Berlin, the work of Trümmerfrauen — women in long lines relaying buckets of rubble — and the haunting green shadows of troops photographed with night-vision cameras in Iraq. Rather than rendering a cohesive argument, Suderburg relies on juxtaposition and the associations generated by seeing patterns of power, oppression, destruction and rebuilding. Dubbed “parataxis” in literature, the technique allows ideas to build not necessarily through hierarchical sequence, with point A leading directly to B, but through connections that weave a dynamic texture of insights — ideas you might not have except through this collision of disparate clips. The closing image, of the night sky swirling above an ancient observatory atop a pyramid — the end credits reveal that it is El Caracol in Yucatan — underscores the video’s sweeping temporal horizon; an easy conclusion would surmise that the ritualistic cycle of power, decline and fall will continue in the movement of history. However, Suderburg’s images are striking for the sharp differences they suggest between the imperialist order that was shaken in World War II and the contemporary call for shock and awe. It’s clear that the regimes taking shape now, which wield enormous power, demand new modes of resistance — a project undertaken by Suderburg’s engaging film and its call for active, thoughtful viewers to step forward and make sense of our world. Holly Willis L.A. Weekly.

Suderburg is the editor of Space, Site, Intervention: Situating Installation Art, (2000), a selection of essays on contemporary installation and related forms of site-specific art. She is also the co-editor of Resolutions: Contemporary Video Practices (1996) and Resolutions 3: Global Networks of Video (2012).  Resolutions: Contemporary Video Practices brings together critical writings that address the role of independent video in a wide array of countries and cultures.  It examines new complications in the medium's site-specificity, given the increase of video sharing and distribution outside the movie theater setting.

Suderburg has taught at Otis College of Art and Design, the California Institute of the Arts, and Pasadena's Art Center College of Design. She is currently a professor at the University of California, Riverside.

Exhibitions
Suderburg's work was chosen for the Fukai International Video Biennale in Japan and also the 2009 La Biennale de Montréal in Canada.  Her films have been screened internationally in numerous locations, including New York, California, Japan, Korea, and Europe. She has also had a large number of solo and group exhibitions.  Her work has been featured at MOCA, MOMA, in International Film Festivals and at many institutions, including the School of the Visual Arts in New York, The American Academy in Rome, CalArts, FilmForum and USC School of Cinema and Television.  In 2012, two of her feature films, Somatography (2000) and Decline and Fall (2007), were screened as part of the Post Pacific Standard Time exhibition at the UCR Sweeney Art Gallery.

Publications
(authored)
"Cold Luminescence and Western In(Sight): Dark Rooms and Wet Lawns" in Pacific Standard Time: Exchange and Evolution. Nancy Buchanan and Kathy Rae Huffman, eds., Long Beach Museum of Art and Getty Museum, 2011.
"Pat O'Neill and the Western Precipice: An Elemental Table of Objects and the Events That Enfold Them" in Views from Lookout Mountain, Julie Lazar, ed. Berlin: Steidl Verlag and the Santa Monica Museum of Art, 2004.
"Welcome to the Epidemic." Xtra, Los Angeles, 2004.
"Working Like A Homosexual" in Journal of the History of Sexuality, San Francisco State University: Department of History, vol. 12, no. 4, October 2003.

(edited)
Suderburg, Erika (ed.). Space, Site, Intervention: Situating Installation Art. University of Minnesota Press, 2000.
Ma, Ming-Yuen S., and Erika Suderburg (eds.). Resolutions 3: Global Networks of Video. University of Minnesota Press, 2012. 
Renov, Michael, and Erika Suderburg (eds.). Resolutions: Contemporary Video Practices. University of Minnesota Press, 1995.

References

External links
 Erika Suderburg's website
 Erika Suderburg at imdb.com

1959 births
American filmmakers
Living people